A saucery was the office in a medieval household responsible for sauces, as well as the room in which the preparation of sauces took place. It was headed by a saucerer. The office was subordinated to the kitchen, and existed as a separate office only in larger households. It was closely connected with other offices of the kitchen, such as the spicery and the scullery. The term is largely obsolete today.

See also
 Condiment
 Sorcery (disambiguation)
 Saucier

References

Medieval cuisine